The Academy of Toulouse is a school district in the Occitanie region of southern France.

It is administered by a rector. The rectory is located in the city of Toulouse.

Departments 
It combines the educational departments of: 
 Ariège (09), 
 Aveyron (12), 
 Haute-Garonne (31), 
 Gers (32), 
 Lot (46),  
 Hautes-Pyrénées (65),  
 Tarn (81) 
 Tarn-et-Garonne (82).

Education in Toulouse